Born in Georgia (translit Dabadebulebi sakartveloshi) is a 2011 Georgian drama film directed by Tamar Shavgulidze.

Cast
 Nutsa Kukhianidze as Nuca kukhianidze
 Tamar Bziava as Tamri Bziava
 Vano Tarkhnishvili
 Giorgi Giorganashvili

References

External links
 

2011 films
2011 drama films
Drama films from Georgia (country)
2010s Georgian-language films
2011 directorial debut films